Gwaneumsa or Kwanumsa can refer to various Korean Buddhist temples:
Gwaneumsa (Seoul), in Gwanak-gu, Seoul
Kwanumsa (Kaesong) in Kaesŏng